Daniil Medvedev defeated the defending champion Andrey Rublev in the final, 6–2, 6–2 to win the men's singles tennis title at the 2023 Dubai Tennis Championships. It was Medvedev's third ATP Tour title in as many weeks, following championships in Rotterdam and Doha. He did not drop a single set en route to the title.

This tournament marked the retirement of former top-50 player Malek Jaziri. He lost in the first round to Alejandro Davidovich Fokina.

Seeds

Draw

Finals

Top half

Bottom half

Qualifying

Seeds

Qualifiers

Lucky losers

Qualifying draw

First qualifier

Second qualifier

Third qualifier

Fourth qualifier

References

External links
 Main draw
 Qualifying draw

Dubai Tennis Championships - Men's 1
Singles men